KQIK (105.9 FM) is a radio station licensed to Haileyville, Oklahoma, United States. The station is currently owned by Will Payne.

History
This station was assigned call sign KQIK on November 19, 2012.

References

External links
KQIK-KNNU coverage map.jpg (JPEG Image, 1200 x 734 pixels) - Scaled (81%)

QIK-FM
Country radio stations in the United States
Radio stations established in 2012